"Orchard Road" is a song by Leo Sayer released in February 1983 as the second single from his tenth album Have You Ever Been in Love. It peaked at number 16 on the UK Singles Chart, becoming his final top-twenty hit until his 2006 feature on "Thunder in My Heart Again".

Release and composition
The music for "Orchard Road" was composed by Alan Tarney, with the lyrics by Sayer. Tarney, who also produced the song, had previously worked with Sayer producing his 1980 album Living in a Fantasy, which included the top-ten hit "More Than I Can Say".

According to Sayer, the lyrics to the song are based on an all-night phone conversation out in a public telephone booth he had with his then-wife, Janice, pleading for her return from her flat and forgiveness after a lapse of judgement in their 7-year marital life. In reality, the song refers to Churchfield Road, Acton in Greater London where his wife had moved out to. However, the name "Churchfield Road" "didn't sing very well", so it was changed to "Orchard Road", the name coming from the shopping area in Singapore as Sayer had recently performed there.

The song was originally recorded in one take as a demo, with Sayer "[making] up the words as we recorded it, with Alan Tarney playing to my hand signals". However, the demo became the final version with the slightly unpolished guide vocal kept due to how it felt.

Track listing
7": Chrysalis / CHS 2677 (UK)
 "Orchard Road" – 4:29
 "Gone Solo" – 3:58

Personnel
 Leo Sayer – lead vocals
 Alan Tarney – backing vocals, Fairlight synthesiser, guitar, bass guitar, Linn Drum machine
 Trevor Spencer – drums

Charts

Weekly charts

Year-end charts

References

1983 songs
1983 singles
Leo Sayer songs
Songs written by Alan Tarney
Songs written by Leo Sayer
Song recordings produced by Alan Tarney
Chrysalis Records singles